The 1998 Arab Cup is the seventh edition of the Arab Cup hosted by Qatar, in Doha. Saudi Arabia won their first title.

Qualifying

The 12 qualified teams are:

Venues

Squads

Overview
Algeria, Egypt and Morocco did not send their senior national teams but instead sent their Under-23 teams to the competition.

Group stage

Group A

Group B

Group C

Group D

Knockout stage

Semi-finals

Third place play-off

Final

Result

Awards
Top Scorer:
  Obeid Al-Dosari (8 goals)
Most Valuable Player:
  Badr Haji
  Mubarak Mustafa
Best Keeper:  
  Mohammed Al-Deayea

References

External links
Details in RSSSF
More Details 

 
Arab Cup, 1998
Arab
Arab
International association football competitions hosted by Qatar
September 1998 sports events in Asia
October 1998 sports events in Asia